Follistatin-related protein 3 is a protein that in humans is encoded by the FSTL3 gene.

Follistatin-like 3 is a secreted glycoprotein of the follistatin-module-protein family. It may have a role in leukemogenesis.

References

Further reading

External links